NASCAR 08 is the eleventh installment of the EA Sports NASCAR series. It was developed by EA Tiburon and released for PlayStation 2, PlayStation 3 and Xbox 360. This was the earliest that EA has released a NASCAR game at the time, until NASCAR 09, which featured a June release. It also marks the first time the original Xbox has been excluded from the NASCAR lineup since NASCAR 2001.

Tony Stewart is on the cover marking his third appearance on the cover of an EA Sports NASCAR game. The cover in the PAL region features Juan Pablo Montoya (as Montoya returns to EA Sports cover athlete since F1 Career Challenge). NASCAR's new Car of Tomorrow as well as the current car are present in the game, although the Car of Tomorrow is generic (no separate manufacturers). ESPN's NASCAR coverage is also integrated into the game.

Reception 
Critical reception of the Xbox 360 and PlayStation 3 version of the game has been mixed. Play magazine gave the game 38%. GameSpot gave the Xbox 360 version a 6.0 rating and a 6.0 for the PlayStation 3 version. The closing comments of the IGN's Xbox 360 review: 

Critical reception of the PlayStation 2 version was better when compared to the previous years NASCAR 07, but was still mixed. The closing comments of the Strategy Informer review:

References

External links

Xbox 360 games
PlayStation 3 games
PlayStation 2 games
NASCAR video games
2007 video games
EA Sports games
Sports video games with career mode
Multiplayer and single-player video games
Split-screen multiplayer games
Video games developed in the United States